The Max Planck Institute for the Neurobiology of Behavior - caesar (MPINB) in Bonn is an institute of the Max Planck Society. It was founded on Jan 1 2022. The institute had been associated with the Max Planck Society since 2006, known as the Center of Advanced European Studies and Research (caesar). Already since that time, the focus of the institute has been on neurosciences.

The MPINB focuses on basic research in neuroethology. The international team of researchers studies the link between brain activity and animal behavior. In cooperation with the local university and research organizations, the MPINB trains the next generation of neuroethologists.

Research 
The team of researchers at the MPINB is interdisciplinary and brings together a unique expertise: biologists, physicists, computer scientists, veterinarians and psychologists work together to unravel the causal link between the brain's action and an animal's behavior as it makes decisions. Approaches range from nano-scale imaging of the brain's synaptic connectivity, to large scale functional imaging, at cellular resolution, in behaving animals, to the detailed quantification of animal behavior. The research groups advance technologies and develop experimental approaches to link neuronal activity to naturalistic behavior in freely moving animals. The institute has unique tools for high-resolution quantification of natural behavior, develops imaging tools for measuring neuronal activity during goal-directed behavior, and reconstructs synaptic connectivity using 3D electron microscopy.

Departments and Research Groups 

The MPINB is home to two departments and eight research groups (as of March 2023).

Departments 
 Computational Neuroethology (Director: Kevin Briggman). The goal of the Department of Computational Neuroethology (CNE) is to develop computational models which can predict goal-directed animal behaviors.
 Behavior and Brain Organization (Director: Jason Kerr). The primary goal of this department is to understand how mammals use vision to make decisions and what the underlying neural processes are.

Research Groups 
 Cellular Computation and Learning (Aneta Koseska). The lab focuses on identifying basic dynamical principles of biochemical computations and single-cell learning.
 Neurobiology of Magnetic Sense (Pascal Malkemper). The lab studies the neurobiological basis of magnetic orientation in mammals
 In Silico Brain Sciences (Marcel Oberlaender). The lab reconstructs neural networks and elucidate mechanistic principles of how the brain integrates sensory information)
 Neurobiology of Flight control (Bettina Schnell). The lab studies how the brain of Drosophila melanogaster controls flight.
 Neural Information Flow (Monika Scholz). The lab uses the foraging behavior of the roundworm C. elegans to research general principles of signal compression, attention and context-dependency in neural systems.
 Neural Circuits (Johannes Seelig): The lab focuses on adaptive neural circuits underlying sensorimotor integration.
 Genetics of Behavior (James Lightfoot). The lab investigates the fundamental principles and molecular mechanisms behind kin-recognition and its associated social behaviors.

References